Thammanoon Niyomtrong (born 20 September 1990), known by his ring name Knockout CP Freshmart, is a Thai professional boxer and former Muay Thai fighter who has held the WBA (Super) mini-flyweight title since 2016.

As of July 2022, Knockout is ranked the #1 strawweight boxer in the world by TBRB, The Ring and ESPN, while BoxRec ranks him as the #2 strawweight in the world.

Muay Thai career
Under the ring name "Newlukrak Pagonponsurin" (นิวลูกรัก ปกรณ์พรสุรินทร์) or "Newlukrak Sor Kattika" (นิวลูกรัก ส.กัตติกา), he won titles at Rajadamnern Stadium and Lumpinee Boxing Stadium in the 105 lbs division. Niyomtrong trains at Excindicongbingbangongym in Bangkok. He's also an amateur boxing Thai national champion.

Professional boxing career

Early career
Sponsored by Thai convenience store chain CP Freshmart (a network of Charoen Pokphand), he won the vacant WBC Youth World mini-flyweight title in his professional debut on June 22, 2012, defeating Marzon Cabilla by a sixth-round technical decision. He successfully made seven consecutive defenses before vacating the minor title.

Freshmart vs. Buitrago 
Knockout then defeated Carlos Buitrago by unanimous decision (115-113, 115–113, 115–113) to win the vacant WBA mini-flyweight interim title on October 1, 2014.

Freshmart vs. Rachman 
Knockout's first defense came against 44-year-old former two-time world champion Muhammad Rachman. He won the fight via a wide unanimous decision (119-111, 117–112, 119–109).

Freshmart vs. Diaz 
Knockout scored a knockout for the first time since claiming the interim world title in July 2015, against Alexis Díaz. Knockout dropped Diaz twice before the referee waved off the fight, giving Knockout a technical knockout win. In April 2016, Knockout went on to rematch Buitrago, winning a wider unanimous decision (119-109, 117–111, 117–111) to defend his title.

WBA Strawweight champion

Freshmart vs. Rojas 
The WBA then ordered a match-up between interim champion Knockout CP Freshmart and their full champion Byron Rojas in April 2016. Rojas was previously the WBA (Regular) champion and had defeated WBA (Super) champion Hekkie Budler to win the full title. The fight took place on June 29 in Khon Kaen. The fight was widely considered boring, as Knockout clinched through most of the fight to no warning from the referee. Nevertheless, he won the fight by unanimous decision (115-113, 115–113, 115–113) to become a world champion.

Freshmart vs. ono 
Knockout was scheduled to make the first defense of his WBA strawweight title against the former OPBF champion Shin Ono on December 14, 2016. Ono was the #14 ranked WBA strawweight contender at the time. Knockout required a few rounds to adjust to the longer southpaw boxing approach of Ono, but began to take the fight over from the fifth round onward. He won the fight by unanimous decision, with scores of 118–109, 117–111, and 118–110.

Freshmart vs. Odaira 
Knockout was scheduled to make his second title defense against the two-time world title challenger Go Odaira on March 1, 2017. Knockout won the fight by a fifth-round knockout, his first stoppage victory in nearly two years. He dropped Odaira with a left uppercut and right straight combination just before the one minute mark, with Odaira being counted out at the 1:07 minute mark. Knockout scored the first knockdown with a right straight in the fourth round.

Freshmart vs. Loreto 
On April 17, 2017, the WBA ordered Knockout to face the mandatory title challenger Rey Loreto, giving the two parties 30 days to negotiate the terms of the bout. Knockout was obligated to make a mandatory title defense by March 28, 2017, and was as such a month overdue. The fight was scheduled for July 15, 2017. Loreto appeared to edge the first four rounds, successfully controlling the range and causing his opponent's eye to begin swelling shut. Knockout began to take over the fight from the mid-rounds onward and won by unanimous decision, with scores of 117–110, 117-110 and 115–113.

Freshmart vs. Landero 
Knockout was scheduled to make the fourth defense of his title against Toto Landero on March 6, 2018, with Knockout coming into the fight as a significant favorite. Knockout controlled the majority of the bout, although Landero was able to momentarily stagger him in the fourth round and opened a cut by his left eye in the fifth round. Knockout won the fight by unanimous decision, with scores of 117–111, 115-113 and 119–110.

Freshmart vs. Chaozhong 
Knockout made the fifth defense of his WBA title against the former WBC mini-flyweight champion Xiong Chaozhong on July 27, 2018. The bout was contested in the Guosen Gymnasium in Qingdao, China, which was the first time that Knockout fought outside of Thailand in his professional boxing career. Knockout won the fight by a wide unanimous decision, with scores of 118–110, 118-110 and 116–112.

Freshmart vs. Rojas 
Knockout was scheduled to fight a rematch with the former WBA mini-flyweight titlist Byron Rojas in his sixth title defense, on November 29, 2018. Knockout beat Rojas for the second time by unanimous decision, with scores of 115–113, 117-111 and 116–112. Both fighters were warned numerous times for hugging, holding, throwing low blows and leading with the head. BoxingScene described the fight as "a totally forgettable fight with both men more interested in fouling than punching".

Freshmart vs. Andales 
Knockout was scheduled to defend his title for the seventh time against ArAr Andales on August 2, 2019. He won the fight by an eight-round technical decision, with scores of 78–74, 77-75 and 79–73, as he was leading on all the judges scorecards. The fight was stopped due to a cut on Freshmart's left eyelid, which was caused by one of the numerous head clashes throughout the bout.

Freshmart vs. Tanaka 
Knockout faced the former OPBF and Japan mini-flyweight champion Norihito Tanaka in his eight title defense on March 3, 2020. He won the fight by unanimous decision.

Freshmart vs. Sithdabnij 
Knockout was scheduled to make his ninth WBA title defense against fellow countryman Pongsaklek Sithdabnij on October 5, 2021, at the Chang Arena in Buriram, Thailand. Knockout won the fight by a third-round technical knockout. He scored three knockdowns prior to the knockout, one in the second and two in the third round.

Freshmart vs. Paradero 
Knockout was scheduled to make his tenth title defense against Robert Paradero on December 14, 2021. He won the fight by a fifth-round technical knockout.

Freshmart vs. Menayothin 
Knockout was scheduled to make his eleventh defense against former WBC mini-flyweight Champion Wanheng Menayothin on July 20, 2022. Knockout won the fight by unanimous decision, with scores of 116-112, 119-109 and 117-111.

Titles and accomplishments

Muay Thai
Lumpinee Stadium
 2013 Lumpinee Stadium 105 lbs Champion
 2014 Lumpinee Stadium 105 lbs Champion
Professional Boxing Association of Thailand (PAT) 
 2012 Thailand 105 lbs Champion

Boxing
World Boxing Council
 2012 WBC Youth World mini-flyweight Champion (defended seven times)
World Boxing Association
 2014 WBA World interim mini-flyweight Champion (defended three times)
 2016 WBA World mini-flyweight Champion (defended eleven times)

Professional boxing record

Muay Thai record

|-  style="background:#cfc;"
| 2014-05-06|| Win ||align=left| Ploysiam PetchyindeeAcademy || Suek Petchpiya, Lumpinee Stadium || Bangkok, Thailand || TKO (Left Knee) || 4 ||
|-  style="background:#cfc;"
| 2014-02-28|| Win ||align=left| Tuktatong Por.Thairungruang || Suek Lumpinee Champion Krekkai || Bangkok, Thailand || Decision (Unanimous) || 5 || 3:00
|-
! style=background:white colspan=9 |
|-  style="background:#cfc;"
| 2013-11-01|| Win ||align=left| Rungnarai Kiatmuu9 || Petchyindee, Lumpinee Stadium || Bangkok, Thailand || KO (Right Hook) || 3 ||
|-  style="background:#fbb;"
| 2013-10-10|| Loss ||align=left| Tuktatong Por.Thairungruang || Petchwiset, Rajadamnern Stadium || Bangkok, Thailand || Decision || 5 || 3:00
|-  style="background:#fbb;"
| 2013-09-03|| Loss ||align=left| Tuktatong Por.Thairungruang || Fairtex, Lumpinee Stadium || Bangkok, Thailand || Decision || 5 || 3:00
|-  style="background:#fbb;"
| 2013-08-09|| Loss ||align=left| Chopper Kor Sapaotong || Petchyindee, Lumpinee Stadium || Bangkok, Thailand || Decision || 5 || 3:00
|-  style="background:#fbb;"
| 2013-06-07|| Loss ||align=left| Satanmuanglek Windysport || Lumpinee Champion Krekkai, Lumpinee Stadium || Bangkok, Thailand || Decision || 5 || 3:00
|-
! style=background:white colspan=9 |
|-  style="background:#cfc;"
| 2013-04-13|| Win ||align=left| Petang Kiatphontip || Rajadamnern Stadium || Bangkok, Thailand || KO (Left Hook) || 2 ||
|-  style="background:#fbb;"
| 2013-02-08|| Loss ||align=left| Satanmuanglek CP Freshmart || Lumpinee Stadium || Bangkok, Thailand || KO (Left low kick) || 3 || 
|-
! style=background:white colspan=9 |
|-  style="background:#cfc;"
| 2013-01-04|| Win ||align=left| Ploysiam PetchyindeeAcademy || Lumpinee Stadium || Bangkok, Thailand || Decision || 5 || 3:00 
|-
! style=background:white colspan=9 |
|-  style="background:#cfc;"
| 2012-10-04|| Win ||align=left| Wanchai Ramboisan || Rajadamnern Stadium || Bangkok, Thailand || Decision || 5 || 3:00
|-  style="background:#cfc;"
| 2012-09-04|| Win ||align=left| Ploiwittaya Rotsurat || Lumpinee Stadium || Bangkok, Thailand || KO (Left Hook) || 4 || 
|-
! style=background:white colspan=9 |
|-
|-
| colspan=9 | Legend:

See also
List of mini-flyweight boxing champions

References

External links
 
 Knockout CP Freshmart - Profile, News Archive & Current Rankings at Box.Live

1990 births
Living people
Knockout CP Freshmart
Mini-flyweight boxers
Knockout CP Freshmart
World Boxing Association champions
Knockout CP Freshmart